Edward Joy Morris (July 16, 1815December 31, 1881) was a Whig and Republican member of the U.S. House of Representatives from Pennsylvania.

Biography
Morris was born in Philadelphia, Pennsylvania.  He attended the common schools and the University of Pennsylvania at Philadelphia.  He graduated from Harvard University in 1836, studied law, was admitted to the bar in 1842 and practiced in Philadelphia.  He was a member of the Pennsylvania House of Representatives from 1841 to 1843.  He was elected as a Whig to the Twenty-eighth Congress.  He was an unsuccessful candidate for reelection in 1844.

He served as Chargé d'Affaires to Naples from January 20, 1850, to August 26, 1853. (In a book, he mentioned Petar II Petrović-Njegoš paying him a visit in Naples in 1851). He was a member of the board of directors of Girard College in Philadelphia, and again a member of the Pennsylvania House of Representatives in 1856.

Morris was elected as a Republican to the Thirty-fifth, Thirty-sixth, and Thirty-seventh Congresses and served until his resignation.  He was appointed Minister Resident to the Ottoman Empire and served from June 8, 1861, to October 25, 1870.   He died in Philadelphia in 1881.  Interment in Laurel Hill Cemetery.

Footnotes

Sources

The Political Graveyard

External links
Appointment of Edward Joy Morris as Minister to the Ottoman Empire, 1861 Shapell Manuscript Foundation

Members of the Pennsylvania House of Representatives
Ambassadors of the United States to the Kingdom of the Two Sicilies
Politicians from Philadelphia
Harvard University alumni
University of Pennsylvania alumni
1815 births
1881 deaths
19th-century American diplomats
Ambassadors of the United States to the Ottoman Empire
Whig Party members of the United States House of Representatives from Pennsylvania
Republican Party members of the United States House of Representatives from Pennsylvania
Burials at Laurel Hill Cemetery (Philadelphia)
19th-century American politicians